Marco Tauleigne (born 30 August 1993) is a French rugby union player. His position is in the Back row and he currently plays for Montpellier Hérault Rugby in the Top 14. He began his career at CS Bourgoin-Jallieu.

References

External links
UBB profile

1993 births
Living people
French rugby union players
Union Bordeaux Bègles players
Rugby union flankers
People from Montélimar
Sportspeople from Drôme
France international rugby union players